The 17613 / 17614 Panvel–Hazur Sahib Nanded Express is an Express train belonging to South Central Railway zone that runs between  and  via Latur, Usmanabad in India. It is currently being operated with 17613/17614 train numbers on Daily basis.

Service

The 17613/Panvel–Hazur Sahib Nanded Express has an average speed of 39 km/hr and covers 674 km in 17h 25m. The 17614/Hazur Sahib Nanded–Panvel Express has an average speed of 44 km/hr and covers 674 km in 15h 30m.

Route & Halts 

The important halts of the train are:

Coach composition

The train had standard ICF rakes which were now replaced with LHB rakes. It runs with a max speed of 110 kmph. The train consists of 22 coaches:
 1 AC I Class cum AC II tier
 1 AC II Tier
 1 AC III Tier
 11 Sleeper coaches
 6 General Unreserved
 2 Seating cum Luggage Rake

Traction

Both trains are hauled by a KJM Loco Shed-based WDP-4 / WDP-4B / WDP-4D diesel locomotive from Panvel Junction} to Hazur Sahib Nanded and vice versa.

Direction reversal

The train reverses its direction 2 times:

Schedule 
Runs daily between Nanded–Panvel–Nanded.

See also 

 Panvel Junction railway station
 Hazur Sahib Nanded railway station
 Lokmanya Tilak Terminus Nizamabad Express

Notes

References

External links 
 17613/Panvel–Hazur Sahib Nanded Express India Rail Info
 17614/Hazur Sahib Nanded–Panvel Express India Rail Info

Transport in Panvel
Transport in Nanded
Express trains in India
Rail transport in Maharashtra
Railway services introduced in 2014